The 1925–26 season was Arsenal's seventh season in the top division of English football.

Results
Arsenal's score comes first

Legend

Football League First Division

Final League table

FA Cup

Arsenal entered the FA Cup in the third round, in which they were drawn to face Wolverhampton Wanderers.

London FA Challenge Cup

See also

 1925–26 in English football
 List of Arsenal F.C. seasons

References

English football clubs 1925–26 season
1925-26